Serdexmethylphenidate (SDX) is a prodrug of dexmethylphenidate created by the pharmaceutical company KemPharm. The compound was first approved by the FDA as one of the active ingredients in Azstarys for the treatment of Attention Deficit Hyperactivity Disorder (ADHD) in children, adolescents, and adults in March 2021. SDX is a prodrug which has a delayed onset of action and a prolonged duration of effects compared to dexmethylphenidate, its parent compound.

Formulations
Serdexmethylphenidate/dexmethylphenidate (Azstarys) was approved by the Food and Drug Administration (FDA) in March 2021 for the treatment of ADHD in patients six years of age and older. Co-formulation of SDX with dexmethylphenidate allows for a more rapid onset of action while still retaining up to 13 hours of therapeutic efficacy.

Due to the delayed onset and prolonged duration of effects following oral administration of SDX, several dosage forms containing SDX are currently under investigation for use as long-acting psychostimulant in the treatment of various CNS disorders, substance use disorder (SUD), and sleep disorders. Under the developmental codename KP484, SDX is being investigated as part of a potential "super-extended duration" psychostimulant, with therapeutic efficacy lasting up to 16 hours following oral administration. 

In January of 2021, the FDA granted approval for clinical trials investigating SDX (as KP879) for the treatment for stimulant use disorder.

Abuse potential
The abuse potential of SDX has been evaluated in clinical studies. Administration of SDX via common routes of administration used during the abuse of psychostimulants such as insufflation and intravenous injection resulted in significantly reduced systemic exposure to active dexmethylphenidate and thus markedly decreased pharmacodynamic effects when compared to unmodified dexmethylphenidate. 

Following an Eight Factor Analysis by the FDA Controlled Substance Staff (CSS), the U.S. Department of Health and Human Services (HHS) provided a scheduling recommendation to the Drug Enforcement Administration (DEA) to control SDX and its salts in schedule IV of the Controlled Substances Act (CSA). Based on this recommendation and its own review, the DEA concluded that SDX met the criteria for placement in schedule IV of the CSA.

References

External links 
 

2-Benzylpiperidines
Methylphenidate
Nootropics
Norepinephrine–dopamine reuptake inhibitors
Pyridinium compounds
Stimulants